Transtillaspis luiscarlosi is a species of moth of the family Tortricidae. It is found in Morona-Santiago Province, Ecuador.

References

External links
 

Moths described in 2003
Transtillaspis
Taxa named by Józef Razowski